The President of the House of Representatives of Morocco is the presiding officer of that body. From the creation of the House of Councillors in 1997, the House of Representatives is the lower house of the Parliament of Morocco.

List

References 
 Official website of the House of Representatives of Morocco (in French)

Politics of Morocco
Morocco, House of Representatives
Political office-holders in Morocco